David Baxby is the former CEO of Global Blue and former Co-CEO of the Virgin Group. He was born on 9 September 1973 in Sydney, Australia. Baxby is currently based in Sydney. As Co-CEO of the Virgin Group, Baxby was responsible for the branded investing activities of the Virgin Group globally.

Roles
David Baxby was appointed Co-CEO of the Virgin Group alongside Josh Bayliss in 2011. He left that position in April 2014 to assume the role of CEO of Global Blue. He is a Non-Executive Director on the following Boards:
 Non Executive Director of Virgin Australia (formerly Virgin Blue) since September 2006
 Non Executive Director of Virgin Atlantic since March 2007
 Non Executive Director of Virgin Holidays since March 2007
 Non Executive Director of Virgin America since January 2009

David Baxby was a Non Executive Director of Virgin Active Australia from 2008 until 2011,  Air Asia X from 2006 until 2011 and Non Executive Director and then Chairman of Virgin Money from 2004 until 2008.

Early career
Following graduation, Baxby worked for 12 months as an Analyst for Arthur Andersen in the Corporate Finance Division.

In 1996, Baxby transitioned to Rothschild and worked as an investment banker. During his tenure he was responsible for numerous gold royalty agreements, oversaw the IPO of Philex Mining on the Toronto Stock Exchange and was an expert valuer in the telecommunications field.

Following his tenure at Rothschild, Baxby moved to Goldman Sachs and spent the next eight years in both the Sydney and London offices as a Partner and executive director. Baxby achieved numerous accomplishments during his time at Goldman Sachs;

 In 2002, he became the Co-Head of the consumer and industrial industry sectors team in the investment banking unit managing a team of 20 bankers and revenue of $75m per annum
 He advised Fosters, Promina, ANZ, the Australian Government, Deutsche Bank, Vodafone, Luxottica and Goldman Sachs.

In 2003 David Baxby advised the Virgin Group on the IPO and sale of a 50% stake in Virgin Blue. It was through his involvement in this matter that Baxby became acquainted with Richard Branson.

In 2004, Richard Branson asked Baxby to come and work for the Virgin Group directly and he joined as CEO of Virgin Management Asia Pacific.  In addition to this, he was also appointed as the Global Head of Aviation, based out of Geneva, Sydney and Shanghai.

David Baxby, returned to Australia for the launch of the Virgin Group and was involved in the early days of its airline operations. In 2006 he moved to Shanghai for two years to explore new opportunities in the region and oversee Virgin's operations in China.

In 2008, Baxby relocated to Geneva, Switzerland to assume responsibilities for Virgin's Aviation investments.

In 2011, David Baxby was appointed Co-Chief Executive. Baxby is responsible for the global branded investment activities of the Virgin Group.

In 2014, Baxby was appointed CEO of Global Blue.

Education
Baxby attended Bond University and received a Bachelor of Commerce, majoring in Accounting and Finance and a Bachelor of Laws (Honours). He graduated in 1994.

Accomplishments
In July 2012 David Baxby was awarded the Robert Stable Alumni Medal from Bond University for exceptional achievements by a graduate. In addition to this, at 32 he was the youngest person on the BRW Expatriates under 45 list.

David Baxby has also been the recipient of numerous academic awards. He was the runner-up Valedictorian, Law and Business School scholarship holder, on the Deans List as well as achieving multiple academic prizes.

Hobbies and charitable associations
Baxby is an avid cyclist and has participated in the Starlight Children's Foundation's ‘Tour de Kids’ for the past 8 years. The 2013 fundraising effort will see Baxby circumnavigating Tasmania.

In addition to this, he is also the Chairman of Virgin Unite in the Asia-Pacific region, which principally focuses of youth at risk, in particular homelessness and drug dependency.

David Baxby is a keen skier and enjoys travelling.

References

Living people
1973 births
Australian chief executives
Bond University alumni
People educated at John Paul College (Brisbane)